Yeyuan Subdistrict is a subdistrict in Linqu County, Weifang, Shandong province, China. , it administers the following 39 villages:
Chijiazhuang Village
Gongjiapo Village
Hongxin Village
Yenan Village
Yexi Village
Yebei Village
Wazi Village
Hongguang Village
Fujializhao Village
Xuejiamiao Village
Wangshe Village
Laoyagu Village
Beiyangshan Village
Shihe Village
Gongjiaqiao Village
Fushanji Village
Dadian Village
Tanjiaxiaocui Village
Zhaojialou Village
Daxinzhuang Village
Sunjiaxiaocui Village
Panjiabu Village
Nanyangshan Village
Yangshanji Village
Zhuyang Village
Beiguangyao Village
Shuangying Village
Nanguangyao Village
Huangjiazhai Village
Baofuling Village
Shiwanya Village
Ping'anyu Village
Mishan Village
Lijiazhuangzi Village
Baita Village
Songzhuang Village
Henan Village
Jieshou Village
Shihedian Village

See also 
 List of township-level divisions of Shandong

References 

Township-level divisions of Shandong
Linqu County